Konuk is a surname. Notable people with the surname include:

İsmail Konuk (born 1988), Turkish footballer
Kağan Timurcin Konuk (born 1990), Turkish footballer
Nejat Konuk (1928–2014), Cypriot politician

Turkish-language surnames